Marc Bendick, Jr. is a United States economist who conducts and applies social science research concerning public policy issues of employment, discrimination, and poverty.

Background
Born in Bridgeport, Connecticut on August 20, 1946, Bendick graduated as a Regents' Scholar from the University of California, Berkeley in 1968, where he studied economics and social psychology. He received his Ph.D. in Economics from the University of Wisconsin-Madison in 1975, where he was affiliated with the Institute for Research on Poverty. His work also reflects the "systems analysis" approach developed in the U.S. Defense Department under Robert S. McNamara, to which he was exposed as an operations research analyst in the aerospace industry from 1968-1970.  His thinking has been further  influenced by long-time collaboration with Mary Lou Egan, Ph.D., a business school professor, researcher and consultant on business strategy, international business, and economic development.

From 1975 to 1984, Bendick was a senior researcher and program manager at the non-profit Urban Institute. Since 1984, he has been a co-principal in Bendick and Egan Economic Consultants, Inc.

Research
Bendick's 140 scholarly publications primarily concern improvement in employment opportunities for workers traditionally disfavored in the mainstream American labor market. This work often involves developing quantitative measures of employment discrimination, including those applying situation testing to discrimination in hiring; benchmarking firms' employment patterns against those of peer firms;  analyzing involuntary occupational segregation; quantifying wage discrimination;  and identifying conscious and unconscious bias in employers’ organizational cultures.

In evaluating anti-poverty strategies in the United States, Bendick’s research has emphasized the complementarities, rather than the substitutability, between public programs and private market-based alternatives.  It thus defined common ground between policies advocated by political liberals (e.g., the War on Poverty) and private market-based alternatives championed by political conservatives (e.g., the Reagan Administration in the USA during the 1980s and during the Tea Party Movement). This research has also identified best practices to enhance the efficiency and effectiveness of both approaches.

Other research by Bendick has examined the experience of other industrialized nations to identify lessons relevant to United States.

Bendick's published research has been cited in other scholarly publications, both in the USA and internationally, more than 5,000 times.

Applying research
Bendick has served as an expert witness in multiple large class action lawsuits involving race, ethnicity, national origin, gender, age, disability, or sexual orientation/gender identity discrimination in employment.   This work has been cited in opinions by 44 Federal courts including the Supreme Court, and in 109 law review articles or legal treatises.  
                      
He has also been a consultant to major U.S. employers on best practices for increasing the diversity of their workforces and the inclusiveness of their workplaces.

In 2022, Bendick received the Impact for Equality Award of the Equal Rights Center, Washington DC.

References

1946 births
Living people
21st-century American economists
UC Berkeley College of Letters and Science alumni
University of Wisconsin–Madison College of Letters and Science alumni